Sarfaraz Naushad Khan (born 22 October 1997) is an Indian cricketer who plays for Mumbai in the Ranji Trophy and for Delhi Capitals in the Indian Premier League (IPL). Sarfaraz represented India in the ICC Under-19 Cricket World Cup in 2014 and 2016. He is an aggressive right handed batsman and a part-time spinner. 

When he made his IPL debut for the franchise RCB in the year 2015, He was the youngest player with only 17 years and 177 days old, to play an IPL match. And, in the very next season, he was the only uncapped player to be retained by a franchise in the IPL. Currently, he is the fourth-youngest player to play in the history of IPL. As a 15-year old in 2012, he was mentioned in to the prestigious Wisden Cricketers' Almanack along with his younger brother Musheer.

Early life and background 
Sarfaraz was born and brought up in the suburbs of Mumbai. He spent most of his childhood in Azad Maidan. There Naushad Khan, his father and coach, nurtured young cricketers such as Iqbal Abdulla and Kamran Khan. His coaching began at an early age when his father discovered his talent of timing the ball well. In monsoon conditions it was difficult for him to reach the maidan (grounds) from his home in the suburbs, so a synthetic pitch was laid beside his house for practice. "Not only does it save our time and energy but it has also helped him get used to bouncier wickets that he will have to deal with later on," his father commented.

He was unable to attend school for 4 years due to his cricket commitments, so a private tutor was employed for his maths and English classes.

Youth and domestic career
He came into the limelight when he broke the Harris Shield record of Sachin Tendulkar, set in 1988, by scoring 439 off 421 balls. It was his maiden Harris Shield game in 2009 when he was just 12 years old. He was playing for his school, Rizvi Springfield. The innings included 56 fours and 12 sixes. He soon started playing for the Mumbai Under-19 team and his performance for them led to selection for the Indian Under-19 team.

In 2013, he scored a match-winning 66 ball 101 against South Africa Under 19s, which included 17 fours and a six. Bharat Arun, the then head coach of the India Under 19 team, commented that: "He is a gusty player, who reads the situation well. He has shots all around the wicket and looks even better when playing straight. He uses his feet well and plays cheeky strokes too."

Sarfaraz played for India in two Under-19 World Cups (2014 and 2016). The 2014 Under-19 World Cup was played by 16 teams in a round robin format where India finished at the 5th position. He scored 211 runs in six games at an average of 70.33; two innings were fifties, and he ended up a strike rate of 105.5. Following this performance, IPL franchise Royal Challengers Bangalore bought him for 5 million for the 2015 season. India finished as runners up in the 2016 Under 19 World Cup in Bangladesh. In the tournament Sarfaraz finished as the second highest run scorer. He scored 355 runs from six innings, with five scores of over 50, at an average of 71. At the Under-19 level he has the record for most number of fifties in World Cups (7 fifties across two World Cups).

Sarfaraz Khan got to his 2nd successive hundred, this time an unbeaten 200-plus score in Round of Ranji Trophy at the Himachal Pradesh Cricket Association Stadium.

Sarfaraz started his Ranji career with Mumbai when he played against Bengal in 2014. He started playing for Uttar Pradesh from the 2015–2016 season. By September 2019  he had played 11 first-class matches and has scored 535 runs with the highest score of 155. He had also played 12 list A matches and had scored 257 runs at a strike rate of 96.25. In January 2020, in the 2019–20 Ranji Trophy match against Uttar Pradesh, Sarfaraz scored his maiden triple century in first-class cricket.

Controversies
In 2011, a school team accused him of being overage. Bone tests showed him to have an age of 15 but according to the birth date registered with the Mumbai Cricket Association he was 13 years old. Sarfaraz and his father went for a second, advanced test. This time the resulting age matched with the registered birth date. Sarfaraz himself was disturbed by this controversy and it affected his emotional health. It took him two to three months to get his focus back on cricket.

In 2015, Sarfaraz made some offensive gestures to the selectors after leading Mumbai to a victory in the Under-19 championship semi-final. As a consequence, he was dropped from the team and along with Suryakumar Yadav. His match fees for two years were withhold as an assurance for his good behavior.

IPL career
After a good performance in the 2014 Under-19 World Cup, Sarfaraz was bought by Royal Challengers Bangalore (RCB) in 2015 for 5 million. At an age of 17, he is the youngest player to have ever participated in an IPL match.  In his debut game against Chennai Super Kings, he scored 11 runs off 7 balls. With the trio of Virat Kohli, Chris Gayle and AB de Villiers dominating in the next two matches he did not get a chance to bat. In the next match he outshone the trio of more established batsmen, scoring 45 runs off 21 balls against Rajasthan Royals. The innings included six fours and a six and helped RCB post a large total. Virat Kohli bowed down to him while he was walking back to the dressing room at the end of the innings. In total in the IPL season for 2015, he played 13 matches and scored 111 runs at a strike rate of 156.33. He started the 2016 season quickly when he played a cameo of 35 runs off 10 balls against Sunrisers Hyderabad. In the 19th over he attacked the bowling of Bhuvaneshwar Kumar, the best bowler of the tournament and scored 4 fours and a six. His teammate Chris Gayle commented that "He's too young and he's like a son to me. He's definitely one for the future and one must keep an eye on him."  

He kept on having short, eventful innings in the 2016 season for RCB. Eventually he was dropped from the team due to his lack of fitness. In 2016 he ended up played 5 matches and scored 66 runs at a strike rate of 212.90. In the 2017 season he injured his leg during a training session and had to miss the entire season.

In a surprising move, RCB retained Sarfaraz over the likes of Chris Gayle, K L Rahul, Kedar Jadhav and Yuzvendra Chahal for the 2018 season. Sarfaraz had a poor season and managed to score only 51 runs from six innings at a strike rate of 124.39. He was eventually released by RCB ahead of the 2019 season. Punjab Kings picked him up for the next season for just 2.5 million. Having his former RCB team-mates like K L Rahul, Chris Gayle and Mandeep Singh helped him through this transfer. He scored 180 runs from eight matches at an average of 45 and a highest score of 67 runs.

In February 2022, he was bought by the Delhi Capitals in the auction for the 2022 Indian Premier League tournament.

References

External links
 

1996 births
Living people
Indian cricketers
Mumbai cricketers
Uttar Pradesh cricketers
Royal Challengers Bangalore cricketers
Delhi Capitals cricketers